The 1899 Western Reserve football team represented Western Reserve University—known as Case Western Reserve University—in the American city of Cleveland, Ohio, during the 1899 college football season. Led by David C. MacAndrew in his second and final season as head coach, Western Reserve compiled a record of 5–4 and outscore opponents by a total of 71 to 44. The team captain was Bill Laub.

Schedule

References

Western Reserve
Case Western Reserve Spartans football seasons
Western Reserve football